Johanna Kampmann-Freund (1888-1940) was an Austrian painter and in 1927 was the first woman to win the Austrian State Prize.

Biography
Kampmann-Freund née Freund was born on 25 March 1888 in Vienna, Austria. She studied at the Vienna Women's Academy. She was married to K. Kampmann from 1916 until his death in 1923. 

In 1927 Kampmann-Freund was the first woman to win the Austrian State Prize, which was for her painting Hagar. She was a member of the Austrian Association of Women Artists (VBKÖ) and the Hagenbund.

Kampmann-Freund died on 1 July 1940 in Vienna. Her work is included in the collection of the  Metropolitan Museum of Art.

Legacy
Her work was included in the 2019 exhibition City Of Women: Female artists in Vienna from 1900 to 1938 at the Österreichische Galerie Belvedere.

Gallery

References

External links 
 

 
1888 births 
1940 deaths
Austrian women painters
20th-century Austrian women artists
Artists from Vienna